4 Freshmen and 5 Saxes is an album by an American male vocal band quartet The Four Freshmen, released in 1957. It reached number 25 on the Billboard Pop Albums chart.

Track listing
 “Liza” (George Gershwin, Ira Gershwin, Gus Kahn) – 2:39
 “You've Got Me Cryin' Again” (Isham Jones, Charles Newman) – 2:50
 “This Can't Be Love” (Richard Rodgers, Lorenz Hart) – 2:03
 “The Very Thought of You” (Ray Noble) – 2:34
 “East of the Sun” (Brooks Bowman) – 3:36
 “I May Be Wrong” (Henry Sullivan, Harry Ruskin) – 2:54
 “There's No One But You” (A H C Croome-Johnson, Redd Evans) – 2:30
 “Sometimes I'm Happy” (Vincent Youmans, Irving Caesar) – 2:15
 “For All We Know” (J. Fred Coots, Sam M. Lewis) – 2:33
 “Lullaby In Rhythm” (Walter Hirsch, Clarence Profit, Edgar Sampson, Benny Goodman) – 2:26
 “This Love of Mine” (Sol Parker, Hank Sanicola, Frank Sinatra) – 2:26
 “I Get Along Without You Very Well” (Hoagy Carmichael) – 3:38

Personnel
 Don Barbour – vocals
 Ross Barbour - vocals
 Bob Flanigan - vocals
 Ken Albers – vocals
 Georgie Auld - saxophone
 Gus Bivona - saxophone
 Bob Cooper  - saxophone
 Chuck Gentry  - saxophone
 Skeets Herfurt  - saxophone
 Ted Nash  - saxophone
 Dave Pell  - saxophone
 Wilbur Schwartz  - saxophone
 Bud Shank  - saxophone

Tracks 1-6 arranged by Pete Rugolo
Tracks 7-12 arranged by Dick Reynolds
Orchestra and chorus conducted by Belford Hendricks

References 

1957 albums
The Four Freshmen albums
Capitol Records albums
Albums arranged by Pete Rugolo
Albums conducted by Belford Hendricks